Hotel Burgas Beach is a 4 stars hotel in Sunny Beach, Bulgaria.

The 19-floor building at 76 m height is the 2nd tallest in Sunny Beach after the Kuban Resort and Aquapark and the 20th tallest building in Bulgaria.

The hotel includes an outdoor swimming pool, a spa center and a sun terrace.

See also 
List of hotels in Bulgaria
List of tallest buildings in Bulgaria

References

External links 
Homepage
Location on Google Maps.

Hotels in Sunny Beach